Fountain Heights is an unincorporated community in Maury County, Tennessee with an elevation of .

References

Unincorporated communities in Maury County, Tennessee
Unincorporated communities in Tennessee